Gli amici di Gesù - Tommaso is a 2001 Italian film directed by Raffaele Mertes and Elisabetta Marchetti, written by Gareth Jones. The cast includes Ricky Tognazzi as the apostle Thomas. It was later dubbed into English and included in the TNT Bible Collection series.

References

2001 films
Bible Collection
2000s Italian films